Shawn W. Campbell is a United States Air Force brigadier general who recently served as the assistant deputy chief of space operations for personnel of the United States Space Force. Previously, he was the director of Talent Management Innovation Cell of the United States Air Force.

References

External links
 

Year of birth missing (living people)
Living people
Place of birth missing (living people)
United States Air Force generals